"Show You" is a song by American rapper Tyga featuring fellow American rapper Future. It was released on August 27, 2013 by Young Money and Cash Money as the third official single from the former's third studio album Hotel California (2013). The song is produced by Detail.

Music video
On July 23, 2013, the music video for "Show You" featuring Future premiered on 106 & Park. "Show You" was released to Rhythmic contemporary radio, as the album's third official single on August 27, 2013.
The music video was directed by Colin Tilley.

Track listing
 Digital single

Charts

Release history

References

2013 singles
2013 songs
Tyga songs
Future (rapper) songs
Cash Money Records singles
Songs written by Detail (record producer)
Song recordings produced by Detail (record producer)
Songs written by Future (rapper)

American contemporary R&B songs